Philip Miller (born c. 1933) is a former American football coach.  He was the head football coach at Bethany College in Lindsborg, Kansas, serving for four seasons, from 1961 to 1964, and compiling a record of 16–18–2.

Head coaching record

References

Year of birth missing (living people)
1930s births
Living people
Bethany Swedes football coaches